Nolan Richardson III (July 16, 1964 – May 13, 2012) was an American college basketball coach and the son of National Collegiate Basketball Hall of Fame coach Nolan Richardson.

Playing career
Richardson played for Booker T. Washington High School in Tulsa, Oklahoma, then played two seasons at Tyler Junior College.  He transferred for his final two years to Oklahoma State University, where he averaged 6.5 points per game in 37 contests.

Coaching career
He began his coaching career as an assistant at Langston University, where he obtained his college degree in 1995.  He then joined his father's staff at Arkansas and remained there for ten seasons.  During his time with the Razorbacks, he coached teams that went to two Final Fours and won the 1994 NCAA championship.

In 2000, Richardson was named head coach at Tennessee State University.  He went 10-19 and 11-17 in his first two seasons, then began the 2002–03 season 2-5 before he was suspended for violating University policy against bringing guns on campus.  Richardson allegedly brought a gun into the Tigers' basketball arena after an argument with assistant coach Hosea Lewis.  Richardson ultimately resigned his position.

Head coaching record

Death
Richardson was found dead in his home on May 13, 2012 of natural causes.

References

1964 births
2012 deaths
African-American basketball coaches
American men's basketball coaches
American men's basketball players
Arkansas Razorbacks men's basketball coaches
Basketball coaches from Oklahoma
Basketball coaches from Texas
Basketball players from Oklahoma
Basketball players from El Paso, Texas
Booker T. Washington High School (Tulsa, Oklahoma) alumni
College men's basketball head coaches in the United States
Langston Lions basketball coaches
Langston University alumni
Oklahoma State Cowboys basketball players
Sportspeople from El Paso, Texas
Sportspeople from Tulsa, Oklahoma
Tennessee State Tigers basketball coaches
Tyler Apaches men's basketball players
Guards (basketball)
20th-century African-American sportspeople
21st-century African-American people